Farsund Idrettslag is a local sports club from Farsund. Farsund Idrettslag takes part in football, handball, volleyball and archery.

Farsund's men's football team is playing in the Fifth Division. The team played in the Third Division between 2008 and 2010.

People that have been in the club includes Martin Spinnangr, Terje Reinertsen, Esben Ertzeid and Christian Tveit.

References

External links 
 

Sport in Vest-Agder
Farsund
Football clubs in Norway
Sports teams in Norway
1916 establishments in Norway